Hemidactylus jubensis, also known as the Ethiopian gecko or Mrioen leaf-toed gecko, is a species of gecko. It is found in Ethiopia, and Somaliland.

References

Hemidactylus
Reptiles of Ethiopia
Reptiles of Somalia
Reptiles described in 1895
Taxa named by George Albert Boulenger